Quanshan Subdistrict is a subdistrict of Jining District in the urban core of Ulanqab, Inner Mongolia, People's Republic of China. , it has 8 residential communities (社区) under its administration.

See also 
 List of township-level divisions of Inner Mongolia

References

External links 

Township-level divisions of Inner Mongolia